Nicasius Russell (died 1646) was a jeweller who worked in London for James I, Anne of Denmark, and Charles I.

Life 
Nicasius Russell, or Nicaise Roussel, was born in Bruges and came to London in 1567 or 1573. He had family connections with Isaac Oliver and Marcus Gheeraerts the younger. He was naturalized as a British citizen in 1608.

Russell made seven ebony pedestals and portraits of men cast in plaster of paris for Henry Frederick, Prince of Wales.

Russell made 12 gold pieces for a chain with knots set with sparks of diamonds for Anne of Denmark. The chain may have used as a prop in The Masque of Beauty.<ref>Thomas W. Ross, Expenses for Ben Jonson's The Masque of Beauty', The Bulletin of the Rocky Mountain Modern Language Association, 23:4 (December 1969), p. 171.</ref>

He dismantled and melted down jewellery belonging to Anna of Denmark in 1609, 1610, and 1611 to make gold plate and aglets, some set with diamonds, and buttons set with rubies and pearls. One of the old jewels had already lost a diamond in 1603 to a jewel for king's hat made in the shape of the letter "I" by John Spilman and William Herrick. This "I" or "J" was sent to Spain in 1623.

Russell sold a portrait of a young man by George Pencz to Prince Charles. This painting is still in the Royal Collection.

In 1623 he published a set of his designs, engraved by Jan Barra, and dedicated to George Heriot, under the title, '''De Grotesco perutilis Liber per Nacasius Rousseel ornatissimo viro Domino G Heriot.

Family 
Russell married firstly Jacomina Wils in 1590, and secondly, in 1604, Clara Johnson, said to be the sister of the painter Cornelius Johnson.

His daughter Elizabeth married John Symcotts of Iseworth. His son Nicasius was a clockmaker.

A son Theodore Russell (born 1614) was a painter, who produced copies of portraits by Anthony van Dyck.

References

External links
 Engraving after Roussel, Nicasius, V&A.

Court of James VI and I
Businesspeople from Bruges
1646 deaths
English jewellers
English goldsmiths
Material culture of royal courts